The Division of Isaacs is an Australian Electoral Division in the state of Victoria. It is located in the south-eastern suburbs of Melbourne, on the eastern shores of Port Phillip Bay. It covers the suburbs of Mordialloc, Keysborough (part), Waterways, Cheltenham (part), Dingley Village, Chelsea, Aspendale, Aspendale Gardens, Edithvale, Bonbeach, Patterson Lakes, Carrum, Parkdale, Mentone, Dandenong South, Highett, Heatherton and Moorabbin.

Geography
Since 1984, federal electoral division boundaries in Australia have been determined at redistributions by a redistribution committee appointed by the Australian Electoral Commission. Redistributions occur for the boundaries of divisions in a particular state, and they occur every seven years, or sooner if a state's representation entitlement changes or when divisions of a state are malapportioned.

History

The division was named after Sir Isaac Isaacs, former Chief Justice of Australia and the first Australian-born Governor-General of Australia. It was proclaimed at the redistribution of 21 November 1968, and first contested at the 1969 federal election. Originally a marginal seat, it switched regularly between the Liberals and Labor. However, Labor has held it without interruption since 1996, and it is now considered fairly safe for that party.

The former Division of Isaacs (1949–69) was located in the inner south-eastern suburbs of Melbourne, and was not related to this division except in name.

Mark Dreyfus became the new Labor member in 2007, and has been re-elected ever since. The division was also contested in 2007 by Laura Chipp, daughter of Don Chipp, for the Australian Democrats.

Members

Election results

References

External links
 Division of Isaacs – Australian Electoral Commission

Electoral divisions of Australia
Constituencies established in 1969
1969 establishments in Australia
City of Kingston (Victoria)
City of Greater Dandenong
Electoral districts and divisions of Greater Melbourne